A musician is anyone who plays a musical instrument or who composes, conducts, or performs music.

Musician may also refer to: 
 Musician (magazine), a monthly music magazine which ran from 1976 to 1999
 "Musician" (song), by Porter Robinson, 2021
 Musician (video game), a 1980 video game

The Musician may refer to:
 Portrait of a Musician, by Leonardo da Vinci, sometimes referred to as the Musician
 The Musician (Bartholomeus van der Helst painting), a Dutch Golden Age painting
 The Musician, one of three figures from the 18th-century Jaquet-Droz automata

See also
Lists of musicians